Remalle is a village in Krishna district of the Indian state of Andhra Pradesh. It is located in Bapulapadu mandal of Gannavaram revenue division.  It is one of the villages in the mandal to be a part of Andhra Pradesh Capital Region.  Remalle is further divided into two parts, New Remalle (Pata Remalle) and Old Remalle (Kotha Remalle).

Kotha

Kotha Remalle is a small village which is located in Bapulapadu Mandal. The village has 100 houses and a population of 1000 people.

Pata

References

Villages in Krishna district